Delvin is a town in County Westmeath, Ireland. Delvin may also refer to:

 Delvin (barony), a barony in County Westmeath, Ireland
 Delvin (civil parish), a civil parish in County Westmeath
 Delvin River, a river in County Dublin
 Delvin (name), people by the name

See also
Delvino (disambiguation)